Wingston is an unincorporated community in Wood County, in the U.S. state of Ohio.

History
A post office called Wingston was established in 1873, and remained in operation until 1905. Besides the post office, Wingston had a United Brethren Church.

References

Unincorporated communities in Wood County, Ohio
Unincorporated communities in Ohio